Year of the Wolf is the fourth album by British singer-songwriter Nerina Pallot. It was released on 13 June 2011. The first single is the track "Put Your Hands Up". Popjustice called the song "an understated yet patently brilliant tune" and "highly addictive".

The album entered the UK Albums Chart at No. 31.

Background and recording
After self-releasing her third album The Graduate, Jolly returned to a major label, Geffen Records, for the release of Year of the Wolf. The album's title comes from her son, Wolfie, with whom she was pregnant during the recording of the album. In an interview with the BBC, Jolly said that her pregnancy affected both the physical recording of the song, making it more difficult to sing, and also its emotional content, particularly the song "History Boys". Talking of that song, she said "there's a human sadness and tragedy at the heart of [war]. And that's what I was trying to describe in the song – loss. The senseless loss of young lives." On whether or not there was a thematic link between that and her anti-war song "Everybody's Gone to War", she said that "on a personal level, I feel less angry, more sad."

The lead single "Put Your Hands Up" was originally written for Kylie Minogue's album Aphrodite. The track was ultimately rejected (although two other Pallot penned tracks "Aphrodite" and "Better than Today" made the final cut). Minogue's album did include a track with the title "Put Your Hands Up (If You Feel Love)" (written by Starsmith and Nervo), but this has no connection to the Pallot song.

Reception

The album received generally positive reviews from fans and critics alike, many complimenting the more mature sound and direction.

Track listing

References

2011 albums
Nerina Pallot albums
albums produced by Bernard Butler